David Harvie was a professional footballer who played as a full back in the Southern League for Bristol Rovers between 1910 and 1920.

Harvie joined Rovers in 1910 from Scottish side Stevenston Thistle, on a recommendation from former Bristol Rovers player James Young, and his tough style of play earned him the nickname 'Hit him' Harvey. He retired from football in 1920, after a war-interrupted ten years with the Bristol club.

References

Year of birth missing
Year of death missing
People from Saltcoats
Scottish footballers
Association football fullbacks
Southern Football League players
Bristol Rovers F.C. players
Footballers from North Ayrshire